Thug Lordz Trilogy is the second collaboration album by American rappers C-Bo, Yukmouth and Spice 1 (together known as the supergroup Thug Lordz). It was released January 1, 2006, on Urbanlife and High Powered Entertainment.

Track listing 
 "Intro"
 "Hustle Hard in Town" (feat. Roscoe)
 "Favorite Gangsta"
 "Get Yo Mouth Right"
 "Thuggin' on 'em"
 "Reppin' My Hood" (feat. G-Dub, Missippi)
 "One Time"
 "Titty Bar"
 "Go to War"
 "Get Ready"
 "Money Ain't a Thang" (feat. Cozmo)
 "When it Comes to Get Money"
 "Thug Lordz Ride Tonight"
 "Mash for a Living"
 "Less Than Nothin'"
 "Until the Day I Die"
 "Outro" (feat. Haji Springer)

Albums produced by Cozmo
Thug Lordz albums
C-Bo albums
Spice 1 albums
Yukmouth albums
2006 albums